Mount Hopeless is the name of several mountains:
 Mount Hopeless (South Australia)
 Mount Hopeless (New South Wales)
 Mount Hopeless (Queensland)
 Mount Hopeless (Victoria)
 Mount Hopeless (New Zealand)